Cathleen Cordell (May 21, 1915 – August 19, 1997) was an American film and television actress. She was described as "a lass born in Brooklyn with an Irish name and an English accent; educated in India and France."

Early years
Cordell was born in Brooklyn, New York. She moved to England, then France, in order to begin her childhood education. "My father's business took him to India when I was a baby," she said, "Then we went to France, and when I was 7 years old I was thrust into a French boarding school." She later attended the Royal Academy of Dramatic Art.

Stage
Cordell's stage debut came in It's You I Want, presented by Seymour Hicks' company in England. Her "first important role" in the United States came in Never Trouble Trouble at the Brighton Theater in Brooklyn, New York, August 17, 1937. A Brooklyn newspaper described Cordell as "a 'discovery' of John Golden" and said the actress "has appeared abroad previously."

Cordell went on to appear on Broadway in Love of Women (1937), Romantic Mr. Dickens (1940), Golden Wings (1941), Yesterday's Magic (1942), Sheppey (1944), While the Sun Shines (1944), and The Linden Tree (1948).

Film
Cordell began her film career in 1938 playing in Who Killed Cock Robin?. (Another source says she "made her film debut in the British version of Gaslight.") She starred in Gaslight (1940) with Anton Walbrook, as Nancy, the housemaid, a role that later launched Angela Lansbury into stardom in the American remake four years later.

She made numerous film and television appearances during her nearly 50-year career.

Radio
Cordell was a member of the casts of Hilltop House (playing Vicky McLain), Amanda (playing Eve Fuller), Valiant Lady (playing Monica Brewster) and Counterspy and appeared in other programs, such as Quiet Please, Grand Central Station and The March of Time.

During World War II, Cordell lived in England and worked for the BBC.

Television
Cordell appeared in two episodes of Perry Mason and Family Affair, and three times in Dragnet 1967, starring Jack Webb. 

In 1963, she appeared as “Mrs. Lawson” in the S6E26 edition of Wagon Train in “The Michael Magoo Story”. 

In 1970 she played Mrs. Beamish in “The Housekeeper” - Season 1 / Episode 1 of Rod Serling's, American anthology television series, Night Gallery.

Later years
Cordell retired from acting in 1985 after appearing in the movie The Return of the Living Dead.

Death
Cordell died on August 19, 1997, in Cedars-Sinai Medical Center, Los Angeles, at age 82.

Radio appearances

Film appearances

Television appearances

References

External links
 

Old Time Radio Researchers Database of People and Programs

American film actresses
American television actresses
Deaths from emphysema
Actresses from New York (state)
People from Brooklyn
Actresses from Los Angeles
1915 births
1997 deaths
20th-century American actresses